Marzano di Nola is a town and comune in the province of Avellino, Campania, Italy. This town is located in the Lauro Valley. It borders with Liveri (Naples province), Pago, Lauro, Domicella and Visciano (Avellino province).

Monuments
The main monuments are: the St. Trifone Parish; the "Madonna dell'Abbondanza" sanctuary; the medieval tower; the rural ancient Roman villa; the manor farm "il Fossato".

References

Cities and towns in Campania